Falciano is a village (curazia) in northeastern San Marino. It belongs to the castle of Serravalle and is its second civil parish in order of population after Dogana.

Geography
The village is located close to Dogana and to the borders with Italy.

Sport
The local football team is the Folgore.

See also
Serravalle
Cà Ragni
Cinque Vie
Dogana
Lesignano
Ponte Mellini
Rovereta
Valgiurata

Curazie in San Marino
Italy–San Marino border crossings
Serravalle (San Marino)